Bulong is a 2011 Filipino comedy horror film directed by Chito S. Roño, written by Roy Iglesias, and starring Angelica Panganiban and Vhong Navarro. The film was released by Star Cinema on February 2, 2011.

Plot
Conan, a nurse, wants to gain the heart of his colleague Ellen and asks his friend on how to achieve his wish. His friend says that there is a legend that if you whisper your wish to a dead body, the soul of the deceased will help you. So he seeks the help of his other friend Oprah (Angelica Panganiban), who is a niece of a soothsayer. He whispers to a corpse his wish that she would fall in love with him. His attempt fails because the corpse became deaf before it died. Conan goes home in disappointment as an old woman is hit by a car nearby. He whispers his wish to her corpse.

The next day while at work, Conan is flirted on by Ellen and it seems that his wish had worked. But suddenly, the old woman begins to haunt him by possessing Ellen and leaves vague hints, leading to his suspension from work when his attempts to fend off the ghost are misunderstood as sexual harassment. Conan seeks the help of Oprah who agrees in exchange for monetary compensation. When Conan pays Oprah the bill includes a piece of paper with a demonic ram's head in it. In horror, Oprah concludes that they must seek her aunt's help. Oprah's aunt reveals that the old woman Conan met was a witch named Paula who wanted to ask forgiveness to her granddaughter Lala after unknowingly cursing her on behalf of a client. She needs Conan to make her drink a potion that is made out of holy water and Paula's finger to repel the curse. She also warns that demons will attempt to stop the resolution of the request, having claimed the lives of Paula's clients.

Conan and Oprah travel to Bohol, where Lala lives. Throughout their journey they survive attacks by people possessed by demons. When the two arrive in Lala's house a centipede-like demon attacks them until Lala drinks the liquid and breaks the curse that was cast upon her, destroying the demon. Paula stops haunting Conan but hits him one last time with a book after making a wisecrack joke.

After treating Oprah out for a date by Manila Bay, Conan and Oprah witness two shooting stars come by, and Conan, finally saying his wish; for Oprah to become his girlfriend. An old woman, who resembles Paula, approaches stating that her wish is to find her twin, with both Oprah and Conan running away in terror.

Cast

 Vhong Navarro as Conan
 Angelica Panganiban as Oprah
 Bangs Garcia as Ellen
 Jon Avila as Dr. Randy
 Eda Nolan as Fatima
 Ruben Gonzaga as Simon
 Neri Naig as Lala
 Teddy Corpuz as Donald
 Sylvia Sanchez as Lili
 Carl John Barrameda as Fatima's brother
 Joy Viado as Aunt Tyra
 Angie Fero as Lola Paula
 Carme Sanchez as Madame Kara
 Mel Kimura as Fake Kumadrona
 Mosang as Morette
 Dimples Romana as Chelsea

Production
Director Rono started working on the movie on October 2010.

Soundtrack
"Superhero" by Teddy Corpuz of Rocksteddy

Reception
Nikki delos Santos of ABSCBN News  complemented the movie's script, characters and execution but criticized the computer-generated demon's realness. Elvin Luciano of the Philippine Entertainment Portal describes the movie as a "feel good horror movie" which might not cater to horror fans.

The film is one of the highest grossing Philippine films in 2011 earning an estimated $1,541,139 in the domestic market.

See also
 List of ghost films

References

External links
 
 
 Star Cinema Multiply Website

2011 films
2011 comedy horror films
Films directed by Chito S. Roño
Mosang films
Philippine comedy horror films
Star Cinema films
Filipino-language films